Petaro (Urdu: پٹارو) is a small town in Jamshoro District near Hyderabad, Sindh, Pakistan. Cadet College Petaro is also located at Petaro.

Recently Jamshoro got the status of a District, therefore, Petaro town is a part of Jamshoro District.

External links
Satellite image

Populated places in Hyderabad District, Pakistan